Ge You (born April 19, 1957) is a Chinese actor. A native of Beijing, often with a bald shaven pate, he is considered by many to be one of the most recognizable acting personalities in China.
He became the first Asian actor to win the Cannes Best Actor Award for his role in the Zhang Yimou movie To Live.

Career
Ge You's father, Ge Cunzhuang, came from an older generation of film actors. Since the 1950s, he has played a large number of characters, largely villains. His iconic works include Little Soldier Zhang Ga, Red Flag Composition, Daqing Artillery Team and so on. He also had a great influence on the improvement of Ge You's performance. Ge You's mother Shi Wenxin was a script editor at the Beijing Film Studio, He Cong, his wife, is an art teacher at Fuwai No. 2 Primary School, and his younger sister Ge Jia is also an editor of the North Film Pictorial. Overall, a filmic family.

After graduating from middle school, Ge You went to the suburbs of Beijing to farm pigs. At the age of 25, he joined the Art Troupe of the National Federation of Trade Unions and became a drama actor. In 1984, Ge You played a small role in Sheng Xia and His Fiancee. In 1988, Ge You participated in the film The Troubleshooters adapted from Wang Shuo's novel The Troubleshooters, and was nominated for the Golden Rooster Award for Best Actor for this film. In 1992, he participated in the TV series comedy Stories From The Editorial Board launched by Beijing TV. In the 10 years since then, Ge You played more than 20 different figures. The most successful one of these is the film To Live directed by Zhang Yimou in 1993 and adapted from the novel To Live by Yu Hua. In the film, Ge You plays the "Fugui" from youth to old age, vividly showing a minor character who has tasted the enjoyment and suffering of the world to the audience, and also brought his acting skills to the fullest. Thus he was the first Chinese man to win the Best Actor Award at the Cannes Film Festival in 1994 .

In addition, in Steel Meets Fire (director He Qun, 1991), he played the puppet army captain, full of human warmth and strength of character, jumping out of the traditional villain constraints. After that, he played the lustful and sanctimonious older brother-in-law in Huang Jianzhong's The Spring Festival and won the Hundred Flowers Award for Best Supporting Actor.  In the 1993 film Farewell My Concubine directed by Chen Kaige, Ge You played the Peking Opera "Yuan Siye" who seemed to be insignificant but extremely wonderful.

Although Ge You's appearance is not outstanding, he can break through the traditional performance routines and explore the human side of the minor characters, making them closer to real life. Ge You has won the love of numerous audiences with his bald figure and tempered humorous style.

Since 1997, he has been cooperating with director Feng Xiaogang and has become his preferred actor. He has co-produced a number of New Year films and once became the biggest winner in the Chinese New Year film market.

On December 1, 2011, Ge You signed a five-year contract with 3 films in total with Emperor Entertainment.

Filmography

Film

Television series

References

External links
 

1957 births
Male actors from Beijing
Living people
Chinese male film actors
Chinese male television actors
20th-century Chinese male actors
21st-century Chinese male actors
Cannes Film Festival Award for Best Actor winners